The Board of the Parliament of Catalonia is the body responsible for the 
management of the Parliament of Catalonia. It is composed of the 
President of the Parliament, 
the two Vice-Presidents of the Parliament and four Secretaries, who 
are elected (in separate votes) by the 
Plenary Assembly.

The main functions of the Board are
to organize the work of Parliament;
to interpret parliamentary procedure;
to manage the various support services of Parliament.
The President (or one of the Vice-Presidents as necessary) is also responsible for chairing sessions of the Plenary Assembly, and for the external representation of Parliament.

Members

First Parliament

Second Parliament

Third Parliament

Fourth Parliament

Fifth Parliament

Sixth Parliament

Seventh Parliament

Eighth Parliament

Ninth Parliament
The Board of the ninth Parliament of Catalonia was elected on 16 December 2010.

Tenth Parliament

Eleventh Parliament
The Board of the eleventh Parliament of Catalonia was elected on 26 October 2015.

Twelfth Parliament
The Board of the twelfth Parliament of Catalonia was elected on 17 January 2018.

Thirteenth Parliament
The Board of the thirteenth Parliament of Catalonia was elected on 12 March 2021.

References
Statute of Autonomy of Catalonia (2006), Art. 59.1.

1980 establishments in Catalonia
Parliament of Catalonia